Hjörvard was the name of several characters in Norse mythology.

Hjörvard Ylfing, see Granmar.
Hjörvard, who rebelled against Hrólf Kraki and killed him, see Heoroweard
Hjörvard, the son of Arngrim.
Hervor's name as a shieldmaiden.

Kings of the Geats
Legendary Norsemen
People in Norse mythology